The Bété languages are a language cluster of Kru languages spoken in central-western Ivory Coast. There are many dialects but they can be grouped as follows:

Western
Bété of Gagnoa
Kouya
Eastern
Bété of Guiberoua
Bété of Daloa
Godié

Bibliography 
 Zogbo, Raymond Gnoléba Parlons bété: Une langue de Côte d'Ivoire (L'Harmattan) 2004
 Zogbo, Raymond Gnoléba, Dictionnaire bété-français, Abidjan : Éditions du CERAP, 2005.
 Lowe, Ivan, Edwin Arthur, and Philip Saunders. 2003. "Eventivity in Kouya." In Mary Ruth Wise, Thomas N. Headland and Ruth M. Brend (eds.), Language and life: essays in memory of Kenneth L. Pike, 429-448. SIL International and The University of Texas at Arlington Publications in Linguistics, 139. Dallas: SIL International and University of Texas at Arlington.
 Saunders, Philip and Eddie Arthur. 1996. Lexique sokuya, sokuya–français, français–sokuya. Abidjan/Vavoua: Projet Linguistique Sokuya. iv, 80 p.
 Arthur Eddie & Sue, Saunders Philip & Heather. 1995 Sɔkɔwɛlɩɩ ʼwʋzɛlɩ -sɛbhɛ (Syllabaire sokuya). Abidjan: Société Internationale de Linguistique.

See also 
 Bété syllabary
 Frédéric Bruly Bouabré

References

External links 
Bété language puzzle
Paper on Kouya Social Organization
Paper on Kouya Funerals

 
Kru languages
Languages of Ivory Coast